Iván Crespo Secunza (born 10 December 1984) is a Spanish footballer who plays for Sestao River Club as a goalkeeper.

He played 12 Segunda División matches for Alavés, but spent most of his career in Segunda División B, making over 300 appearances in service of seven clubs.

Club career
Born in Santander, Cantabria, Crespo made his senior debut with local Racing de Santander's C-team CD Tropezón. He played mostly in the Segunda División B but also in the Tercera División in his early years as a senior, representing Real Murcia Imperial, Águilas CF, Lorca Deportiva CF, Lucena CF and Gimnástica de Torrelavega.

On 5 July 2012, Crespo signed with CD Mirandés, recently promoted to the Segunda División. On 11 September he appeared in his first professional match, a 2–0 home win against Recreativo de Huelva for that season's Copa del Rey.

On 2 January 2013, Crespo joined third division club Deportivo Alavés. He finished his debut campaign with 20 appearances (playoffs included) as the Basque side returned to division two after four years, playing 12 matches in his second where he acted mainly as a backup to new signing Iñaki Goitia.

On 29 August 2014, Crespo moved to Real Murcia also in the third tier. On 17 June of the following year, he joined Lleida Esportiu of the same league, conceding 20 goals in his only season with the Catalans – best in the group. 

Crespo returned to Racing on a two-year deal on 8 August 2016, and repeated his previous year's feat as the team qualified for the play-offs.

References

External links

1984 births
Living people
Spanish footballers
Footballers from Santander, Spain
Association football goalkeepers
Segunda División players
Primera Federación players
Segunda División B players
Tercera División players
CD Tropezón players
Real Murcia Imperial players
Águilas CF players
Lorca Deportiva CF footballers
Lucena CF players
Gimnástica de Torrelavega footballers
CD Mirandés footballers
Deportivo Alavés players
Real Murcia players
Lleida Esportiu footballers
Racing de Santander players
Algeciras CF footballers
Sestao River footballers